Dao (pronunciation: , English approximation:  , Chinese: 刀; pinyin: dāo) are single-edged Chinese swords, primarily used for slashing and chopping. They can be straight or curved. The most common form is also known as the Chinese sabre, although those with wider blades are sometimes referred to as Chinese broadswords. In China, the dao is considered one of the four traditional weapons, along with the gun (stick or staff), qiang (spear), and the jian (double-edged sword), called in this group "The General of Weapons".

Name
In Chinese, the word  can be applied to any weapon with a single-edged blade and usually refers to knives. Because of this, the term is sometimes translated as knife or  Nonetheless, within Chinese martial arts and in military contexts, the larger "sword" versions of the dao are usually intended.

General characteristics

While dao have varied greatly over the centuries, most single-handed dao of the Ming period and later and the modern swords based on them share several characteristics. Dao blades are moderately curved and single-edged, though often with a few inches of the back edge sharpened; the moderate curve allows them to be reasonably effective in the thrust. Hilts are sometimes canted, curving in the opposite direction of the blade, which improves handling in some forms of cuts and thrusts. The cord is usually wrapped over the wood of the handle. Hilts may also be pierced like those of jian (straight-bladed Chinese sword) for the addition of lanyards. However, modern swords for performances will often have tassels or scarves instead. Guards are typically disc-shaped and often cupped. This was to prevent rainwater from getting into the sheath and blood dripping down to the handle, making it more difficult to grip. Sometimes guards are thinner pieces of metal with an s-curve, the lower limb of the curve protecting the user's knuckles; very rarely, they may have guards like those of the jian.

Other variations to the basic pattern include the large bagua dao and the long handled pudao.

Early history

The earliest dao date from the Shang Dynasty in China's Bronze Age, and are known as zhibeidao (直背刀) – straight-backed knives. As the name implies, these were straight-bladed or slightly curved weapons with a single edge. Originally bronze, these weapons were made of iron or steel by the time of the late Warring States period as metallurgical knowledge became sufficiently advanced to control the carbon content. Originally less common as a military weapon than the jian – the straight, double-edged blade of China – the dao became popular with cavalry during the Han dynasty due to its sturdiness, superiority as a chopping weapon, and relative ease of use – it was generally said that it takes a week to attain competence with a dao/saber, a month to attain competence with a qiang/spear, and a year to attain competence with a jian/straight sword. Soon after dao began to be issued to infantry, beginning the replacement of the jian as a standard-issue weapon. Late Han dynasty dao had round grips and ring-shaped pommels, and ranged between 85 and 114 centimeters in length. These weapons were used alongside rectangular shields.

By the end of the Three Kingdoms period, the single-edged dao had almost completely replaced the jian on the battlefield. The jian subsequently became known as a weapon of self-defense for the scholarly aristocratic class, worn as part of court dress.

Sui, Tang, and Song dynasties 

As in the preceding dynasties, Tang dynasty dao were straight along the entire length of the blade. Single-handed  ("belt dao") were the most common sidearm in the Tang dynasty. These were also known as hengdao ("horizontal dao" or "cross dao") in the preceding Sui dynasty.

During the Song dynasty, one form of infantry dao was the shoudao, a chopping weapon with a clip point. While some illustrations show them as straight, the 11th century Song military encyclopedia the Wujing Zongyao depicts them with curved blades – possibly an influence from the steppe tribes of Central Asia, who would conquer parts of China during the Song period. Also dating from the Song are the falchion-like dadao, the long, two-handed zhanmadao, and the long-handled, similarly two-handed buzhandao (步戰刀).

Yuan, Ming and Qing dynasties

With the Mongol invasion of China in the early 13th century and the formation of the Yuan dynasty, the curved steppe saber became a greater influence on Chinese sword designs. Sabers had been used by Turkic,  Tungusic, and other steppe peoples of Central Asia since at least the 8th century CE. It was a favored weapon among the Mongol aristocracy. Its effectiveness for mounted warfare and popularity among soldiers throughout the Mongol empire had lasting effects.

In China, Mongol influence lasted long after the collapse of the Yuan dynasty at the hands of the Ming, continuing through both the Ming and the Qing dynasties, furthering the popularity of the dao and spawning a variety of new blades. Blades with greater curvature became popular, and these new styles are collectively referred to as (佩刀). During the mid-Ming, these new sabers would completely replace the jian as a military-issue weapon.

Yanmaodao

The yanmaodao or "goose-quill saber" is largely straight like the earlier zhibeidao, with a curve appearing at the center of percussion near the blade's tip. This allows for thrusting attacks and overall handling similar to that of the jian while preserving much of the dao's strengths in cutting and slashing.

Liuyedao

The liuyedao or "willow leaf saber" is the most common form of Chinese saber. It first appeared during the Ming dynasty and features a moderate curve along the length of the blade. This weapon became the standard sidearm for cavalry and infantry, replacing the yanmaodao, and is the sort of saber used by many schools of Chinese martial arts.

Piandao

The piandao or "slashing saber" is a deeply curved dao meant for slashing and draw-cutting. This weapon bears a strong resemblance to the shamshir and scimitar. Skirmishers generally used it in conjunction with a shield.

Niuweidao

The niuweidao or "oxtail saber" is a heavy-bladed weapon with a characteristic flaring tip. It is the archetypal "Chinese broadsword" of kung fu movies today. It was first recorded in the early 19th century (the latter half of the Qing dynasty) and only as a civilian weapon: there is no record of it being issued to troops, and it does not appear in any listing of official weaponry. Its appearance in movies and modern literature is thus often anachronistic.

Besides these four major types of dao, the duandao or "short dao" was also used, this being a compact weapon generally in the shape of a liuyedao. Also, during the Qing, there appeared weapons such as the nandao, regional variants in the name or shape of some of the above dao, and more obscure variants such as the "nine ringed broadsword", these last likely invented for street demonstrations and theatrical performances rather than for use as weapons.

The Chinese spear and dao (liuyedao and yanmaodao) were commonly issued to infantry due to the expense of and relatively greater amount of training required for the effective use of the Chinese straight sword, or jian. Dao can often be depicted in period artwork worn by officers and infantry.

During the Yuan dynasty and after, some aesthetic features of Persian, Indian, and Turkish swords would appear on dao. These could include intricate carvings on the blade and "rolling pearls": small metal balls that would roll along fuller-like grooves in the blade.

Recent history

The dadao was used by some Chinese militia units against Japanese invaders in the Second Sino-Japanese War, occasioning "The Sword March". The miaodao, a descendant of the changdao, also saw use. These were used during planned ambushes on Japanese troops because the Chinese military and patriotic resistance groups often had a shortage of firearms. 

Most Chinese martial arts schools still train extensively with the dao, seeing it as a powerful conditioning tool and a versatile weapon, with self-defense techniques transferable to similarly sized objects more commonly found in the modern world, such as canes, baseball or cricket bats, for example. Some schools teach double sword  雙刀, forms and fencing, one dao for each hand. 

One measure of the proper length of the sword should be from the hilt in your hand, the tip of the blade at the brow, and, in some schools, the shoulder height. Alternatively, the sword's length should be from the middle of the throat along the size of the outstretched arm. There are also significantly larger versions of dao used for training in some Baguazhang and Taijiquan schools.

Nandao 

The nandao or "southern broadsword" is a modern innovation used for contemporary wushu practice.

In contemporary wushu 
Daoshu refers to the competitive event in modern wushu taolu where athletes utilize a dao in a routine. It was one of the four main weapon events implemented at the 1st World Wushu Championships due to its popularity. The dao itself, consists of a thin blade that makes noise when stabbing or cutting techniques are used. Over time, the edge has become more flimsy to create more noise, the sword has become lighter to allow for faster handling, and the flag of the broadsword has become smaller to become less of a distraction. The IWUF has also created three standardized routines for competition and an elementary practice. The first compulsory routine was produced and recorded by Zhao Changjun in 1989.

Daoshu routines in international competitions require certain sword techniques, including:

 Chán Tóu (Broadsword Twining) 
 Guǒ Nǎo,(Wrapping with the Broadsword) 
 Pī Dāo (Broadsword Chop) 
 Zhā Dāo (Broadsword Thrust) 
 Zhǎn Dāo (Broadsword Hack) 
 Guà Dāo (Broadsword Hooking Parry) 
 Yún Dāo (Broadsword Cloud Waving) 
 Bèi Huā Dāo (Broadsword Wrist Figure 8 Behind the Back).

Only the Chán Tóu and Guǒ Nǎo techniques have deduction content (code 62) where the back of the blade has to be kept close to the body. Daoshu routines have been judged with the degree of difficulty criteria at the World Wushu Championships since 2005.

In media
 Michelle Yeoh uses dao swords when playing Yu Shu Lien on Crouching Tiger, Hidden Dragon and its sequel Crouching Tiger, Hidden Dragon: Sword of Destiny.
 Zuko, a major character on the Nickelodeon animated series Avatar: The Last Airbender used two daos.
 Power Rangers: Jungle Fury features the Shark Sabres, based on daos. 
 The Doctor's thirteenth incarnation, Yasmin Khan, the Chinese pirate queen Zheng Yi Sao, and Sin Ji-Hun used daos to fight Sea Devils on the Doctor Who episode Legend of the Sea Devils. 
 Chow Yun-fat wields a dao sword when playing Sao Feng, the pirate lord of the South China Sea on Pirates of the Caribbean: At World's End. 
 Shang Chi and the Legend of the Ten Rings features daos of Chinese dragon scales used by the warriors of Ta Lo.
 A dao was one of many weapons used by Ho Tao on Heroes of the East. 
 Dynasty Warriors features a dadao used by Dian Wei.
 In Dragonheart: A New Beginning, Lian briefly wielded a dao. 
 Power Rangers: Ninja Storm features General Trayf, a pig-themed alien warrior, using a dao.  
 Inuyasha the Movie: Affections Touching Across Time features Hari using two daos.
 Deadliest Warrior'' features warriors of the Ming Dynasty using daos during a fight with musketeers.

See also
Chinese swords
Dha (sword)
Sabre
Jian

References

Note List

Bibliography

External links

 Sword with Scabbard - 17th century example - Metropolitan Museum of Art
 Saber (Peidao) with Scabbard – 18th or 19th-century example – Metropolitan Museum of Art

Chinese inventions
Chinese swords
Single-edged swords
Events in wushu
World War II infantry weapons of China